Selçuk is a district and town of İzmir Province, Turkey.

Selçuk may also refer to:

 Selçuk (name), a Turkish masculine given name
 Selçuk University
 Uyanış: Büyük Selçuklu, a Turkish television series

See also
 Selcuk (disambiguation)
 Seljuk (disambiguation)